The Ukhtasar Petroglyphs are rock-carvings found on Mount Ukhtasar, "Pilgrim Mountain", near the town of Sisian in Armenia's southern province of Syunik. 

Over 2,000 decorated rock fragments extend to the foot of the mountain. These petroglyphs, some believed to date back to the Paleolithic (12,000 BCE), are carved onto dark brownish-black volcanic stones left behind by an extinct volcano. Later Chalcolithic and Bronze Age cultures continued to create petroglyphs at the site; "the largest variety and number of carvings date to this period and the early Iron Age, before it was finally abandoned except for a few carvings made by lonely shepherds spending their summers on the mountain top." Although the site was discovered in the early 20th century, it was not really studied until the 1920s and again in the late 1960s; it is still not fully understood today.

The carvings on the rock fragments depict hunting scenes, a wide array of animals, spirals, circles and geometric shapes, and even zodiac signs. Research suggests that the area served as a temporary dwelling for nomadic cattle-herding tribes, and studies of the rock carvings indicate that they were in use for hundreds of years, with peoples of later eras adding their own engravings to the stones. According to the research of Hamlet Martirosyan, the pictograms of Ughtasar represent a writing system known as "goat writing" or "itsagir". Many scholars believe that this was due to the large number of goats drawn on the stones, but according to Martirosyan it is because in the ancient Armenian language, the words “goat” and “writing” were homonyms. They would use these homonyms to express concepts through pictures, thus the abstract concept of “writing” (which in ancient Armenian can be expressed with words like “shar” – arrange, “sarel” – compile, “tsir” – a line) found its reflection in the representation of a goat (“zar”), because the words for “writing” and “goat” sounded the same. Goats are a prevalent theme on the stones, possibly because the word “dig” in ancient Armenian meant goat and was close enough to “diq,” the ancient word for gods.  By combining abstract signs with the images of animals and people in horizontal or vertical rows, prehistoric engravers were able to convey specific messages.

Reproductions of the petroglyphs, or rock engravings, of Ughtasar can be found all over Yerevan; they are inscribed onto silver jewelry, painted onto coffee cups, traced into hand-made pottery, and they adorn the walls of cafes. Reaching the petroglyphs of Ughtasar can be challenging.

See also
 Karahunj or Zorats Karer, a nearby prehistoric site also known as the "Armenian Stonehenge"
 Armenian Gampr dog

References

External links 

Ughtasar: The Petroglyphs of Armenia
Ughtasar Petroglyphs - ArmeniaPedia.org

Archaeology of Armenia
Rock art in Europe
Petroglyphs